Microbacterium oxydans is a Gram-positive bacterium from the genus Microbacterium which occurs in human clinical specimens. Microbacterium oxydans has the ability to degrade alginate and laminarin.

References

Further reading

External links
Type strain of Microbacterium oxydans at BacDive -  the Bacterial Diversity Metadatabase	

Bacteria described in 1966
oxydans